Reus Deportiu is a Catalan sports club best known for its professional roller hockey team based in Reus, Catalonia, Spain.

History
CD Reus was founded on 23 November 1909 after the dissolution of Reus Sport Club. On 29 September 1917, the club merged with Club Velocipedista and SC Olímpia becoming the multi-sports club Reus Deportiu. In 1951, Reus Deportiu was restructured into two independent entities: CF Reus Deportiu, entirely dedicated to football, and Reus Deportiu, for the rest of the sections. Apart from the roller hockey team, which plays in the OK Liga, it also has athletics, basketball, chess, rhythmic gymnastics, hiking, karate, artistic roller skating, rugby, table tennis and tennis sections.

Reus enjoyed its golden era between 1967 and 1973, winning six European Cups in a row, four Spanish Leagues and four national Cups. One decade later, it won the 1983 national Cup and Supercup and the 1984 Cup Winners' Cup.

The club had to wait nearly two decades for its next trophies, the CERS Cup in 2003 and 2004. In subsequent years Reus won its sixth national cup in 2006, the World Championship in 2008 and its seventh European League in 2009 plus the consequent Continental Cup and Intercontinental Cup.

In 2011, Reus Deportiu achieved its eighth OK Liga in 2011, 38 years after their last title of the national League. On 14 May 2017, Reus conquered its eighth European League, exactly 50 years after the first one in the history of the club.

Women's team

In addition to these achievements, Reus Deportiu created a women's section in 2007 that would get a vacant berth in the women's OK Liga in 2011, but would resign to continue in the first division two years later, due to the financial problems of the club.

Six years later, the club came back after finishing in the third position of the Nacional Catalana and the resigns of HC Borbolla and CP Coslada to promote.

Season to season

Trophies

Campeonato de España: 2
1947, 1952.
Liga Nacional: 3
1965–66, 1966–67, 1968–69.
OK Liga: 5
1969–70, 1970–71, 1971–72, 1972–73, 2010–11.
Copa del Rey: 6
1966, 1970, 1971, 1973, 1983, 2006.
Supercopa de España: 2
2006, 2019.
European Cup/Champions League: 8
1967, 1968, 1969, 1970, 1971, 1972, 2009, 2017.
CERS Cup : 2
2003, 2004.
Cup Winners Cup : 1
1984.
Continental Cup/European Super Cup: 1
2009.
World Club Championship: 1
2008.
Intercontinental Cup: 1
2009.
Catalan Championships: 1
1967.
Little World Cup: 1
1969.

Presidents

References

External links
Official website 
Tecnol main sponsor of the team

Catalan rink hockey clubs
Multi-sport clubs in Spain
Sports clubs established in 1909
Sport in Reus